Sean or Seán MacManus may refer to:

 Seán MacManus (politician) (born 1950), Irish Sinn Féin politician in Sligo
 Sean McManus (television executive) (born 1955), American television network executive
 Seán McManus (priest), County Fermanagh-born, USA-based nationalist activist priest

See also
Shaun McManus (born 1976), Australian rules footballer
Shawn McManus (born 1958), American comic book artist